The  Ministry of Culture and Information Policy or MinCult is the main state authority in the system of central government of Ukraine responsible for country's cultural development and history preservation. It is fully based on the former Ministry of Culture and Tourism (that was dissolved in 2010). The Honcharuk Government (on 29 August 2019) merged the Ministry of Youth and Sports into the ministry. But its succeeding Shmyhal Government undid this merger. The Shmyhal Government did rename the Ministry of Culture, Youth and Sports into the Ministry of Culture and Information Policy on 26 March 2020. From 2 December 2014 to 29 August 2019 Ukraine had a (separate) Ministry of Information Policy.

History

Ukraine (1917–1919)
The origin of the Ukrainian ministry could be traced to the earliest creation of the General Secretariat of Ukraine where a department of culture was created in 1917 within the Secretariat of People's Education headed by Ivan Steshenko. It was created on same principles that existed during the Russian Empire where cultural life in Ukraine was administered by the Russian Ministry of Enlightenment (see Ministry of National Education (Russian Empire)). In May 1918 there was established Ministry of People's Education and Arts headed by Mykola Vasylenko. Later there was Ministry of Art headed by Dmytro Antonovych (December 1918 - February 1919) that was disbanded soon after the Soviet invasion of Ukraine.

There also existed Ministry of Confessions that was first created during the government of Skoropadsky on April 30, 1918 and was at first headed by Mykola Vasylenko. After the fall of Skoropadsky government Ministry of Confessions (April 30, 1918 - December 14, 1918) was transformed into Administration of Cults at first and later into Ministry of Denomination (February 13, 1919) both headed by Ivan Lypa. One of the most noticeable ministers however was Ivan Ohiyenko.

Soviet Ukraine
With advancing Bolsheviks in Ukraine, there also was established the People's Commissariat of People's Education that took over most of cultural life in Ukraine.

On 25 February 1919 by its decree, the Council of People's Commissariats of UkrSSR (CPC of UkrSSR) established Cinema Committee within its People's Commissariat of People's Education  and registering all electro-theatres in Ukraine. On 19 February 1921 the CPC of UkrSSR issued statement obligating its People's Commissariat of People's Education to use all of artwork for purpose of communist agitation (propaganda). Previously by decree of 14 December 1920, the CPC of UkrSSR established Main Political and Educational Committee within its People's Commissariat of People's Education.

Another decree of CPC of UkrSSR of 11 March 1921 "About purchase for state museums museum valuables from private individuals" initiated creation of state museums which were previously "nationalised" by Bolsheviks "in the name of the Revolution" in form of simple expropriation. Along with that there was established All-Ukrainian Committee in Conservation of artworks, artifacts, and natural landmarks.

On 19 April 1921 CPC of UkrSSR issued decree "About peasants homes" (selyanski budynky) establishing centers of political education (propaganda) in rural areas.

On 22 November 1922, on efforts of people's commissar Hrynko, the Central Executive Committee of Ukraine adopted its statement "About enacting Code of Laws about People's Education" which defined the network of cultural and art institutions, their framework of functioning, and mechanisms of administration.

Structure

The ministry consists of the central body of ministry headed by its leadership composed of a minister, his/her first deputy, and other deputies in assistance to the minister. Part of ministry is composed of several state administrations that are specialized in certain field and coordinate operations of government companies.

Central Body
Leadership
Minister
First Deputy
Deputies
Deputy-Chief of Aparat

Section in support of the Minister's performance
Sector of informational-analytic work and communication with public

Sector of control and checks in execution of acts and orders of the President of Ukraine, the Verkhovna Rada, and the Cabinet of Ministers of Ukraine as well as the orders of leadership

Sector of job-secrecy work

Sector of mobilization work and public security

Section of financial revisions and support of measures in the fight with corruption
Sector for prevention and counter-action of corruption

Section of human resources and state service

Directory of legal support
Section of legal expertise
Section for the use of legislation
Sector for conducting a claim work

Directory of Affairs
Section for documents support and control
Section for cooperation with Verkhovna Rada
Sector for organization of access to the public information

Department in formation of the state policy in the sphere of culture, art, and education
Directory of Arts
Section of musical art
Section of theatrical art
Section of monumental, artistic, and folk art
Sector of circus art
Directory for strategical planning of cultural development and regional policy in the sphere of culture
Section of analysis and forecasting of activities in learning institutions
Section of analysis and forecasting of socio-cultural development of regions
Section of analysis and forecasting of libraries activities
Others;

State agencies
State Service of Cinematography
State Service in control of transportation of cultural valuables over the State Border
State Service in protection of the National Cultural Heritage
State Service of Tourism and Resorts

Ministerial institutions and organizations
The ministry also administers a network of museums, libraries, cultural centers, regional centers of folklore, national cultural heritage sites, various artistic education in schools and universities, has own research centers and institutions, promotes circus, musical and theatric arts in regions.

The ministry also maintains the registry of fixed landmarks of cultural heritage (national and local). On 11 December 2012 there were 4,719 such landmarks, 891 of national significance and the other 3,828 of local significance.

Note: while most of the educational state institutions are administered by the Ministry of Education, most arts educational state institutions are administered by the Ministry of Culture.

Ukrainian cultural centers
 Cultural center of Ukraine in Russia
 Ukrainian cultural and information center in Sevastopol
 State agency in promotion of culture of Ukraine

Museums under Ministry jurisdiction

 National Art Museum of Ukraine
 Aivazovsky National Art Gallery
 Lviv National Art Gallery
 Lviv National Museum
 Museum of The History of Ukraine in World War II
 National Historical Museum of Ukraine
 National Museum-Preserve "Battle for Kyiv 1943"
 Ukrainian National Chornobyl Museum
 National Museum of Literature of Ukraine
 National Museum of Taras Shevchenko
 National Research Restoration Center of Ukraine
 Directorate of Arts Exhibitions of Ukraine
 National Museum Sanctuary of Ukrainian Pottery
 Memorial to the Holodomor Victims in Ukraine
 Prison on Lontskoho
 Marshal Konev Height
 Historic Museum of Church of the Tithes

Culture and Heritage reserves managed by the ministry

 National Historical and Cultural Reserve "Hetman's Capital"
 National Reserve "Khortytsia"
 National Kyiv-Pechersk Historic-Cultural Reserve
 National Reserve "Sophia of Kyiv"
 National Historic-Archeological Reserve "Kamyana Mohyla"
 National Historic-Memorial Reserve "Babyn Yar"
 National Historic-Memorial Reserve "Bykivnia Graves"
 National Historic-Cultural Reserve "Kachanivka"
 National Historic-Cultural Reserve "Chyhyryn"
 National Historic-Memorial Reserve "Fields of Berestechko Battle"
 National Historic-Ethnographic Reserve "Pereyaslav"
 National Reserve Hlukhiv
 National Reserve "Castles of the Ternopil Land"
 National Historic-Architectural Reserve "Kamianets"
 Shevchenko National Reserve in Kaniv
 National Architectural-Historic Reserve "Chernihiv ancient"
 National Reserve "Chersonesos Tuarica"
 National Reserve "Ancient Halych"

List of Ministers of Culture

Ukrainian SSR

Post-Declaration of Ukrainian independence
{| class="wikitable"
!rowspan="2"| Name of Ministry
!rowspan="2"| Name of minister<ref>Kateryna Slipchenko. Remember everyone: Who, how and when headed the Ministry of Culture of Ukraine (Згадати всіх: Хто, як і коли очолював Міністерство культури України). Zaxid.net. 4 December 2014</ref>
!colspan="2"| Term of Office
|-
! Start
! End
|-
| rowspan="2"| Ministry of Culture
| Larysa Khorolets
| August 24, 1991
| November 17, 1992
|-
| Ivan Dzyuba
| November 17, 1992
| August 19, 1994
|-
| rowspan="4"| Ministry of Culture and Arts
| Dmytro Ostapenko
| September 25, 1995
| August 4, 1999
|-
| Yuriy Bohutsky
| August 4, 1999
| December 7, 1999
|-
| Bohdan Stupka
| December 30, 1999
| May 31, 2001
|-
| Yuriy Bohutsky
| June 1, 2001
| February 3, 2005
|-
| rowspan="4"| Ministry of Culture and Tourism
| Oksana Bilozir
| February 4, 2005
| October 5, 2005
|-
| Ihor Likhovyi
| October 5, 2005
| November 1, 2006
|-
| Yuriy Bohutsky
| November 1, 2006
| December 18, 2007
|-
| Vasyl Vovkun
| December 18, 2007
| March 11, 2010
|-
| rowspan=5| Ministry of Culture
| Mykhailo Kulynyak
| March 11, 2010
| December 24, 2012
|-
|Leonid Novokhatko
|December 24, 2012
|27 February 2014
|-
|Yevhen Nyshchuk
|27 February 2014
|2 December 2014
|-
| Vyacheslav Kyrylenko
| December 2, 2014
| April 14, 2016
|-
| Yevhen Nyshchuk
| April 14, 2016
| 29 August 2019
|-
| rowspan="1"| Minister of Culture, Youth and Sports
|Volodymyr Borodiansky
| 29 August 2019
| 4 March 2020
|-
| rowspan="2"| Minister of Culture and Information Policy
| Svitlana Fomenko (acting)
| 10 March 2020
| 4 June 2020
|-
| Oleksandr Tkachenko
| 4 June 2020
| incumbent 
|-

|}

See also
 Cabinet of Ministers of Ukraine
 List of historic reserves in Ukraine
 Ukrainian Book Institute
 Premieres of the Season (Musical Festival)

 References 

Further reading
Bohutskyi, Yu. Ukrainian society in aspect of its organization and self-organization (УКРАЇНСЬКЕ СУСПІЛЬСТВО В АСПЕКТІ ОРГАНІЗАЦІЇ ТА САМООРГАНІЗАЦІЇ)''. Theory and History of Culture (ТЕОРІЯ ТА ІСТОРІЯ КУЛЬТУРИ).

External links 
 Official Website of the Ukrainian Ministry of Culture
 Official website

Culture
Culture
Ukraine, Culture
Ukraine
1953 establishments in Ukraine